Gian Carlo Capicchioni (born 19 February 1956) is a Sammarinese politician who served as a Captain Regent for a 6-month term in 2013 and 2014, alongside Anna Maria Muccioli. He was previously the capitano (mayor) of Serravalle and a member of the Grand and General Council.

References

1956 births
Captains Regent of San Marino
Secretaries of State for Finance of San Marino
Living people
Members of the Grand and General Council
Party of Socialists and Democrats politicians